Scottish Housing News is a daily digital news service for Scotland's affordable housing sector, which comprises housing associations, local councils, government and charities.

The service is sponsored by the Chartered Institute of Housing in Scotland and the Glasgow and West of Scotland Forum of housing associations.

Its sister publication, Scottish Construction Now, is also published by Dundee Press Agency.

External links 
 Official website

References 

Housing in Scotland
Scottish websites
2001 establishments in Scotland
British news websites